The battle of the Mérida pocket, also known as the closing of the Mérida pocket, was an action that took place during the Spanish Civil War in July 1938 in La Serena zone of Badajoz Province. A swift and decisive operation, it was masterminded and carried out by the Francoist military and ended up becoming a bloodbath for the Republican troops. 

Although it was one of the major battles in the Spanish Civil War, the relevance of the closing of Mérida pocket was eclipsed by the onset of the Battle of the Ebro which took place roughly at the same time at the other end of the Republic.

Background
The Mérida pocket was the westernmost border of the Spanish Republic in 1937; protruding westwards towards Mérida, a town that had been secured by rebel forces in 1936 at the time of the Battle of Mérida. The pocket was a wedge of Republican territory between the rebel-held areas to the northwest and to the southwest until relatively late in the conflict. But in May 1938 the Francoist high command issued a plan to take this territory that had been in Republican hands since the Extremaduran front had stabilized in 1937. 

Allegedly there was the danger that the Republican Army from that position could easily attack the strategic town of Mérida and even cut in two the Nationalist zone —hence the notion that it was like a kind of "open" door or window that had to be closed. Therefore, after the rebel military had reached the Mediterranean in the east, the activity on the Extremaduran front was revived with the aim to conquer that territory in an operation named "closing of Mérida pocket".

Battle
The offensive was planned by the Francoists in two phases: First the line of the high course of the Zújar River was reinforced between the 14 and 20 June. Secondly the offensive would be carried out between 20 and 24 July encircling and trapping the Republican troops entrenched in the place. The swiftly-executed rebel pincer movement from the flanks of the pocket caught the Republicans by surprise.

The battle began when rebel forces of General Saliquet from the north advanced southwards on 20 July. After four days of pounding enemy lines they met the northwards advancing armies of General Queipo de Llano at Campanario on 24 July. The combats resulted in a massive slaughter of loyalist troops belonging to the Extremaduran Army (Ejército de Extremadura) led by Colonel Ricardo Burillo. The fast victory allowed the Francoist territory to expand eastwards, reaching La Jara comarca in Toledo Province.

Aftermath
This rebel military operation was responsible for one of the greatest losses in human lives among Spanish Republican Army soldiers in Extremadura. Among the units annihilated by heavy rebel fire after getting caught at the end of the pocket were the 91st Mixed Brigade and the 109th Mixed Brigade. The Republican soldiers who surrendered were interned at the concentration camp in Castuera, where a number of them would be shot. Colonel Ricardo Burillo, who had been commander of the Extremaduran Army since 24 November 1937 was abruptly dismissed on 31 July and replaced by Colonel Adolfo Prada.

See also
Group of Central Region Armies
List of Spanish Nationalist military equipment of the Spanish Civil War
List of Spanish Republican military equipment of the Spanish Civil War

References

External links
Memorial Campo de Concentración de Castuera
Fortificaciones en la Guerra Civil Española en Castuera (Badajoz)

Battles of the Spanish Civil War
1938 in Spain
Conflicts in 1938
Spanish Civil War in Extremadura